Ian Keteku is a poet, musician and freelance journalist.  Born as Ian Nana Yaw Adu Budu Keteku, his birth name mimics his diverse talents and interests. Raised in Canada and of Ghanaian heritage, Keteku earned the title of World Slam Poetry champion in France in the summer of 2010.

Poet 

Ian Keteku defines his poetry as 'critical oratory', feeling compelled to speak on the issues he feels are not thought about regularly. He loves to use his words to inspire messages of peace, action and critical thought. He believes poetry is the universe’s way of showing us the beauty in emotion, the similarity in experiences and the art of living. He has performed his poetry and music all over the world. He seeks to use the exploration of language as an articulation and cure for the human condition. He believes that words have power and attempts to utilize such powers to illustrate the connectedness of all things.

Keteku conducts poetry, writing and performance workshops for students of all ages and various community groups, inspiring people to accept the power of their own voice. He is also a mentor to other experienced and budding poets. Keteku coached the 2013 Toronto poetry slam team to a national victory, and IF, a Toronto-based poet to the 2014 individual national victory.
 
The Calgary born Keteku was raised by Ghanaian parents, this upbringing heavily influences his art. His work follows in the lineage of ancient African storytellers by paying homage to the past and revisiting themes and lessons from previous generations. In addition, Keteku is a devout practitioner of Afrofuturism; a philosophy of projecting the black experience into a celestial, technological future.
 
As a video artist, he has directed and produced many thought-provoking poetic films, which have been screened internationally. And, cited artist and humanitarian in forums.

Journalist 
He has been featured in the Calgary Herald, Fast Forward Magazine, and Edmonton Journal, CBC television, CBC radio, RCI and a number of campus radio stations across the nation. But his use of words to tell stories does not end there. As a freelancer, Keteku has written for the Ottawa Citizen, Calgary Herald, Toronto Star, The Globe and Mail, and others.

Through video journalism Keteku has produced stories for CBC Calgary, CJTV News and i-Channel, where he covered the victory of Barack Obama in Chicago.

Musician 

In 2004 Keteku under the moniker Emcee E released his debut album, Iantrospective. Positive bound lyrics combined with philosophical undertones created a stir in the Edmonton hip-hop arena. Songs such as "My Story" which illustrated the need to begin the global peace process and "Fashion Passion" which shows the danger of our obsession with material wealth set the tone for the whole album. But there is more to Emcee E than just thought provoking poetry and edgy lyricism. His quick wit and ability to win over crowds with his distinct charm has allowed him to fare well as a former battle MC.

In September 2011, Ian Keteku released his first spoken word album L.F.P.E. Lessons From Planet Earth (Re-Evolution), draws musical influences from Afro-beat, trip-hop, hip-hop, folk music and blends them with socially conscious, metaphor-pregnant lyrics.

Most recently in February 2015, Keteku released Love and Lumumba, his sophomore spoken-word album. Love and Lumumba is a narrative soundscape of spoken word poetry caressed by future-beat electronic melodies. Themes of revolution, race, lust and loss are all explored throughout the album. The sound is a genre-bending amalgamation of down-tempo instrumentals with thought-provoking lyrics. The genre of sound is called "Poetronica" (Poetry + Electronica).

References 

20th-century Canadian poets
20th-century Canadian male writers
Canadian male poets
Living people
Year of birth missing (living people)